Sahak-e Abd ol Nabi (also Romanized as Saḩāk-e ‘Abd ol Nabī and Sahāk-e ‘Abd ol Nabī; also known as Shahrak-e Sho‘eyb Nabī-ye Qadīm) is a village in Shoaybiyeh-ye Gharbi Rural District, Shadravan District, Shushtar County, Khuzestan Province, Iran. At the 2006 census, its population was 271, in 48 families.

References 

Populated places in Shushtar County